Pedro Bernardo do Rio (born 21 November 2000) is a Brazilian footballer who plays for Athletico Paranaense as a midfielder.

Career statistics

Club

References

2000 births
Living people
Brazilian footballers
Association football midfielders
Associação Ferroviária de Esportes players
Club Athletico Paranaense players